Massunguna Alex Afonso (born May 1, 1986 in Benguela), better known as Dani Massunguna is an Angolan football defender who currently plays for Primeiro de Agosto.

Club career

Dani Massunguna started his career at Primeiro de Agosto, when he was promoted from the youth team in 2002. He played three seasons for them in the Girabola before moving to Deportivo Huíla in 2005. He spent two seasons for them before moving to Primeiro de Maio. Dani only played for them for one season before moving back to his first club, Primeiro de Agosto. He is now an integral part of their first team, and his good performances led to an international call-up.

International career

Dani Massunguna was first called into the National Team in 2010 and has now gained 5 caps.

International goals
Scores and results list Angola's goal tally first.

References

External links

1986 births
Living people
Angolan footballers
Angola international footballers
C.D. Primeiro de Agosto players
Estrela Clube Primeiro de Maio players
Girabola players
People from Benguela
2012 Africa Cup of Nations players
2013 Africa Cup of Nations players
2019 Africa Cup of Nations players
Association football defenders
2011 African Nations Championship players
Angola A' international footballers